Miklos Varga (born 26 August 1987) is a Hungarian amateur boxer who competed at the 2008 Olympics but lost his only bout at lightweight to Merey Akshalov. At the 2012 Summer Olympics, he again lost in the first round, this time to Evaldas Petrauskas.

References

External links
Data

Living people
Lightweight boxers
1987 births
Boxers at the 2008 Summer Olympics
Boxers at the 2012 Summer Olympics
Olympic boxers of Hungary
Place of birth missing (living people)
Hungarian male boxers
Boxers at the 2015 European Games
European Games competitors for Hungary